The 1969 Georgia Bulldogs football team had represented the Georgia Bulldogs of the University of Georgia during the 1969 NCAA University Division football season.

Some of the more prominent players for the Bulldog were Jake Scott, Mike Cavan, Tommy Lyons, and Spike Jones.

Schedule

Source: 1970 Georgia Bulldogs Football Media Guide/Yearbook

Roster

References

Georgia
Georgia Bulldogs football seasons
Georgia Bulldogs football